Julia Grabher was the defending champion but chose not to participate.

Raluca Șerban won the title, defeating Ekaterine Gorgodze in the final, 6–3, 6–0.

Seeds

Draw

Finals

Top half

Bottom half

References

Main Draw

Bellinzona Ladies Open - Singles